Vegas Revolution is a 2008 Travel Channel show that goes behind the scenes of Las Vegas attractions.  The series includes Vegas Spectacles, Vegas Adrenaline, Vegas Cravings, Vegas  Extravagance, and Vegas Retreats.  It is produced by Prometheus Entertainment.

References

External links 
 

Travel Channel original programming
Las Vegas Valley
2010s American television series
2008 American television series debuts